Takeshita (written:  or ) is a Japanese surname. Notable people with the surname include:

, Imperial Japanese Navy admiral
, Japanese actress
, Japanese professional wrestler
, Japanese general
, Japanese politician and Prime Minister of Japan
, Japanese fashion model and actress
, Japanese footballer
, Japanese badminton player
, Japanese politician
, Japanese politician
, Japanese volleyball player
, Japanese slalom canoeist

See also
Takeshita Street in Harajuku, Tokyo, Japan

Japanese-language surnames